Blaise Faggiano is an American football coach and former player.  He is the head football coach at Utica University in Utica, New York, a position he had held since the 2008 season.

Faggiano graduated from Ithaca College and was a member of the football team. In 1991 they won the NCAA Division III Football Championship. After Ithaca, Faggiano became a graduate assistant coach at the University at Albany. He then returned to Ithaca in 1995 to coach football.

Head coaching record

References

External links
 Utica profile

Year of birth missing (living people)
Living people
Albany Great Danes football coaches
Ithaca Bombers football coaches
Ithaca Bombers football players
Utica Pioneers football coaches
St. John Fisher Cardinals football coaches
Sportspeople from Rochester, New York